Gaspocyrtoceras is a genus of orthocerids included in the Paraphragmitidae. Its fossils are limited to North America and have been found in Wisconsin and Quebec.

The shell of Gaspocyrtoceras is a coarsely annularted exogastric cyrtocone.  Curvature is upward, the ventral side convex in profile. Annulations slope dorso-ventally to the rear as they do in Calocyrtoceras.  Striations on the surface, fine goove-like features, are longitudinal in contrast to the transverse striations of Cyrtocycloceras.

References

 Walter c. Sweet, 1964. Nautiloidea- Orthocerida. Treatise on Invertebrate Paleontology, Part K. Geologica Society of America.

Prehistoric nautiloid genera
Silurian animals